Ampullosansonia renephilippei is a species of sea snail, a marine gastropod mollusk in the family Pickworthiidae.

Original description
        Poppe G.T., Tagaro S.P. & Goto Y. (2018). New marine species from the Central Philippines. Visaya. 5(1): 91-135.
page(s): 97, pl. 5 figs 1-2.

References

Pickworthiidae
Gastropods described in 2018